Trigonidium cicindeloides  is a small beetle-like species of sword-tail crickets, widespread in Africa, southern Europe, and southern Asia. During mating season males make a sound created by vibrating the last two joints of their maxillary palpi. This is either to attract females for mating or to drive off other males.

References

Trigonidiinae
Insects described in 1838
Orthoptera of Europe